Key Poulan (born 1962) is an American composer and arranger of marching band and concert band works. He studied trombone at East Texas State University, graduating in 1985 with a bachelor's degree in music education. He has written brass arrangements for several drum corps, including the Santa Clara Vanguard, Mandarins, Spirit of Atlanta, Cavaliers, Glassmen, Raiders, Seattle Cascades, and Spartans. Poulan's marching band arrangements are published around the world, and include Heartbeat, House of Cards, Seven (7 Deadly Sins), Vanishing Point, RED, Canon: Deconstruction/Reconstruction, Chronometry, Circuitry, Classic Schizophrenia, Four Winds, Earth: Construction in Four Movements, Luminosity, Jules Verne Journeys, X, and Bermuda Triangle!. His newest shows include Chakra!, Optical Illusions, Phobias, and Voodoo in 2011.

References

External links
Official Website

Living people
American male composers
21st-century American composers
1962 births
21st-century American male musicians